Thambaiyah Mudaliyar Sabaratnam (died 1970) was a Ceylon Tamil lawyer, politician and member of the Legislative Council of Ceylon.

Early life and family
Sabaratnam was born in the late 1880s. He was the son of Mudaliyar Thambaiyah from Mullaitivu in north-eastern Ceylon. He was educated at St. Patrick's College, Jaffna.

Sabaratnam married Vathiri. They had a son and daughter.

Career
Sabaratnam studied law at Ceylon Law College and became a proctor of the Supreme Court, practising law in Jaffna. He contested the 1924 legislative council election as a candidate for the Northern Province East (Mullaitivu-Vavuniya-Vadamarachchi) seat and was elected to the Legislative Council of Ceylon unopposed.

Sabaratnam stood as the All Ceylon Tamil Congress (ACTC) candidate for Vavuniya at the 1947 parliamentary election but was defeated by independent candidate C. Suntharalingam. He was defeated by Suntharalingam at the 1956 parliamentary election as well.

Sabaratnam was a member of the Board of Management of the Ramakrishna Mission Ceylonese branch. He died in 1970.

Electoral history

References

1970 deaths
20th-century Sri Lankan lawyers
20th-century Sri Lankan politicians
All Ceylon Tamil Congress politicians
Alumni of Ceylon Law College
Alumni of St. Patrick's College, Jaffna
Ceylonese proctors
Members of the Legislative Council of Ceylon
People from Northern Province, Sri Lanka
People from British Ceylon
Sri Lankan Hindus
Sri Lankan Tamil lawyers
Sri Lankan Tamil politicians
Year of birth missing